St. Thomas' Episcopal School (STES) is a private, co-ed Episcopal institution serving Pre-kindergarten through 12th grade. It is located in the Meyerland area of Houston, Texas. The school has 553 students and 111 faculty members. It is accredited by the Southwestern Association of Episcopal Schools and is a member of the Houston Association of Independent Schools (HAIS) and the Texas Association of Private and Parochial Schools (TAPPS). Starting in 2020, STES will embark on a $29,000,000 construction project to restore and enhance the school campus. Construction is set to finish in the fall of 2021.

History
The school opened in September 1955, under the guidance of founder T. Robert Ingram as an outreach mission of Saint Thomas' Episcopal Church. Its first high school class graduated in 1967. Since then, many graduates have gone on to universities and trade schools throughout the nation and abroad.

In the wake of the murder of George Floyd and the subsequent protests in 2020, a group of STE alumni asked the school leadership to acknowledge the deceased founder's segregationist writings and to take measures against racism.

Founding principles
The school's mission is "to form honorable men and women through a classical education grounded in a Christ-centered worldview." Starting at the kindergarten level, the school offers a structured, classical education.

Curriculum

Lower school
The lower school curriculum includes formal instruction in grammar and composition, phonics and spelling, and reading comprehension. The earlier years are largely foundational: students are taught to think about language as a logical, hierarchical progression. In later years, students sharpen these skills and apply them to reading literature, both secular and sacred, and writing short essays. In addition to language, students also receive instruction in arithmetic and mathematical reasoning throughout their entire course of study.

Middle school

Language arts
The middle school curriculum continues the study of language arts: grammar, vocabulary acquisition, writing, and literature. The faculty maintains a largely prescription approach to the study of grammar and syntax and, to this end, grammar is approached in a rigorous, systematic way. Sentence parsing and diagramming are frequently employed to demonstrate the organization of grammatical constructs. As the curriculum progresses, students will be expected to write longer essays about a variety of topics incorporating a more varied lexicon and complex grammatical forms. They will be graded on both style and content. Additionally, students will apply all of their language arts skills to analyzing and criticizing great English language works.

Mathematics
Students will also continue their study of mathematics, building on the foundation set in the lower school curriculum.  The six and seventh grade are largely devoted to the study of pre-algebra and elementary algebra concepts: fractions, integers, square roots and exponents, decimals, and the Cartesian coordinate system, among others. Eighth graders will undertake a formal study of Algebra I to prepare them for the rigors of upper school mathematics.

Enrichment and electives
Middle school students take a variety of other courses and have a selection of electives available to them. Social studies include investigation of the major political, economic, and social events that shaped the ancient and classical world and provides context for a deeper appreciation of Biblical history. The scientific method is presented through a detailed study of physical and life sciences, wherein students will have the opportunity to participate in exciting demonstrations and experiments that elucidate core concepts. The study of Latin and a modern Romance language (either French or Spanish) is also an important part of the curriculum as is development of basic technology competency critical to navigating the Information age. Finally, electives like choir, strings, band, highland dancing, art, speech, and theater help students to develop important skills and, in many cases, find a lifelong passion.

Upper school

The upper school curriculum is primarily intended to prepare students for higher education and to this end students take core, college-preparatory courses and electives based on their individual interests.

Advanced Placement Program

The School has an exceptionally well-developed Advanced Placement (AP) program, wherein students take classes that closely parallel university-level courses in the same subject. These classes follow a strict syllabus and are graded more rigorously than non-AP courses. They culminate in a standardized, comprehensive exam each spring, a passing score on which may earn the student college credit. Most St. Thomas students take at least one AP course throughout their four years and many take two or more.

English

Students are required to take English for all four years, and each course is organized along a thematic axis: 9th grade- Epic Literature, 10th- American Literature, 11th- British Literature, 12th- Comparative Literature. Eleventh and Twelfth grade English are each offered with an AP option for well-prepared students intending to sit the national exams in Language and Literature.  Each year, upper school students are required to write a comprehensive research paper in addition to the variety of shorter analysis papers they prepare. Central to the English curriculum is a required summer reading program for all students: these carefully selected fiction and non-fiction works are intended to inculcate a lifelong love of reading for pleasure. Finally, students will continue to refine their grammar, syntax, and vocabulary through drills and weekly quizzes in anticipation of standardized tests like SAT and ACT.

Mathematics

All students take four years of mathematics to include the studies of geometry, algebra II, trigonometry, pre-calculus, calculus, and differential equations. In recent years, students have been divided into an “Accelerated” or “Level” track. The course of study is largely the same, but the “Accelerated” track includes a more in-depth analysis of theoretical topics whereas the “Level” track takes a more applied approach. The culmination of the “Accelerated” track is usually AP Calculus or differential equations whereas “Level” students can choose between calculus, statistics, and finite math.

Science

Upper school students are required to take a minimum of three years of natural science. These courses include biology, chemistry, and physics, some of which includes a weekly, mandatory after-school laboratory section. Upon completion of first year courses in each subject, students may elect to take the corresponding AP course. During certain years, based on student demand, geology and AP Environmental Science are available as natural science electives.

Social science

Required social sciences classes are: two years of American/Texas history, one year of American politics and economics, and one year of history of western philosophy. Well-prepared students may opt to take AP US History during 10th grade and AP US Government & AP Macroeconomics during 11th grade. These courses are substantially more rigorous than their non-AP counterparts and follow the College Board's AP syllabus closely. A variety of social science electives are also typically offered to upperclassman: AP Modern European History, AP Comparative Politics, AP Human Geography, and AP Psychology.

Classics

The study of Latin is an integral part of the Upper School curriculum and is also divided into two tracks: Accelerated and Level. The Level course is intended for students with little or no previous experience with Latin and includes two years study of basic grammatical forms and vocabulary to be applied to translation of simple works. Following the first two years, students will take two “Topics” courses that cover Roman and Greek culture and society and analysis of works in translation. The Accelerated course is for students with a strong foundation in elementary Latin grammar and vocabulary. During the foundational years, students will learn more complex grammatical constructs and build their lexicon. They will apply the aforementioned to translating increasingly complex Latin prose and poetic works in many cases in their original form. Seneca, Cicero, and Horace are several of the writers typically covered. The Accelerated course culminates in AP Latin Virgil, wherein students translate and analyze substantial portions of Virgil's Aeneid. Well-prepared students often complete the Accelerated course by the end of their junior year. In past years, these students could then prepare to sit the AP Latin Literature exam, however this exam has recently been discontinued. Accelerated students who wish to continue their study of the Latin language may do so by engaging in a course of self-study directed by a faculty mentor. Both Level and Accelerated students are encouraged to compete in annual Latin competitions put on by the American Classical League. National Junior Classical League(NJCL) is a youth organization of secondary school students sponsored by the American Classical League.

Modern languages

Modern languages available to St. Thomas students are Spanish and Chinese. Well-prepared students who begin their study of a particular language in middle school may sit the corresponding AP exam during their senior year.

Electives

Electives offered to students vary each year but typically include: yearbook, speech and debate, visual arts, band, dance, theater, orchestra, mock trial, computer science, and physical education.

College counseling
 
Ancillary to the curriculum is a dedicated college counseling service available to all upper school students. This includes daily office hours with the counselor, personalized college search help, college visits, essay editing, practice interviews, scholarship and financial aid information, and monthly workshops and newsletters.

Transportation
The school has a student bus service from and to Pearland.

Awards and recognition

The school offers a wide range of extracurricular and co curricular activities for students at all levels.

These include a Mock Trial team that has won 14 regional championships and a state championship, and a yearbook program that has won two Silver Crown and four Gold Crown Awards from the Columbia Scholastic Press Association, most recently in 2012. The yearbook has also won multiple National Pacemaker Awards, the highest national recognition for American student publications.

STES finished in third place overall at the 2006 TAPPS State Academic Meet.  Two STES students tied for 1st place in the overall science category, making top scores in biology, physics, and chemistry.

Twenty-six percent of the Class of 2008 are National Merit semifinalists or commended students.

STES students have won many accolades in sports competitions as well. The boys' soccer program has placed first in the TAPPS state championships five times, including winning the 2019 and 2020 championships. The current head coach is Christopher White, who has compiled a 122-25-3 record. The girls' varsity soccer team won the TAPPS state championship in 2020. The boys' varsity cross country team won 5 TAPPS 3A state championships from 2009 to 2012 and again in 2014 while the varsity girls won their first championship in 2010. The varsity girls' swim team also won the state championship from 2010 to 2013 and again from 2015 to 2017. The high school orchestra has also competed at the State level competition, including winning first place among its division as one of the smallest groups competing (2013).

In 2011 and 2014 the school won the Henderson Cup. The Henderson Cup is an overall champion award determined by the points each school earns in the 24 TAPPS championships held throughout the school year. That same year, St. Thomas' Episcopal had two of its students named 3A Division Athletes of the Year.

Niche rankings rated St. Thomas’ Episcopal the number one Christian high school in the Houston area for 2019.

Bagpipe program
The school has a bagpipe band. The bagpipe and drum band and highland dancing team have been to Scotland on several occasions to compete in the World Championship Pipe Band Competition in Glasgow, Scotland. The band placed first in the Championship five times and individual dancers have received numerous accolades. Recently in 2017, the band won the U.S. Pipe Band Championships in Norfolk, Virginia. As of 2019, the school's Alumni Pipe Band is ranked 2nd in the world.

In the school year of 2011–2012, the school allowed female musicians to play in the bagpipe and drum band. Resulting from BLM protests in 2020, there was a proposal to change the band kilt (the McPherson Hunting tartan) to move away from colors rumored to have been based on the Confederate States of America.

See also

 Christianity in Houston

References

External links
 St. Thomas' Episcopal School
 St. Thomas Alumni Registry* St. Thomas' Episcopal School Pipe Band

Private K-12 schools in Houston
Christian schools in Houston
Preparatory schools in Texas
Episcopal schools in the United States